The General Secretary of Bangladesh Awami League is the executive person of this political organization of Bangladesh. He gave orders or advice for all departmental functions as the secretary of the organization. He took care of all matters, from the appointment or dismissal of the staff of the organization to the approval of the executive of the organization. In addition to verifying various documents including election expenditures during the election, he also delegates responsibility among the party's organizational editors in consultation with the party Chairman.

List of General Secretary

See also 
 Bangladesh Awami League

References

 
 
Bangladesh Awami League